Strype is a town in the Dutch province of South Holland. It is a part of the municipality of Voorne aan Zee, and lies approximately 8 km northwest of Hellevoetsluis.

The statistical area "Strype", which also can include the surrounding countryside, has a population of approximately 200.

References
 

Populated places in South Holland
Voorne aan Zee